Peroxynitrous acid (HNO3) is a reactive nitrogen species (RNS). It is the conjugate acid of peroxynitrite (ONOO−). It has a pKa of approximately 6.8.  It is formed in vivo from the diffusion-controlled reaction of nitrogen monoxide (ON•) and superoxide. It is an isomer of nitric acid and isomerises with a rate constant of k = 1.2 s−1, a process whereby up to 5% of hydroxyl and nitrogen dioxide radicals may be formed. It oxidises and nitrates aromatic compounds in low yield. The mechanism may involve a complex between the aromatic compound and ONOOH, and a transition from the cis- to the trans-configuration of ONOOH. Peroxynitrous acid is also important in atmospheric chemistry.

References

Nitrogen oxoacids
Peroxy acids
Nitrogen(III) compounds